Riffat Aziz is a Pakistani-Kashmiri politician who is currently a member of Azad Kashmir Legislative Assembly.

References 

Pakistani political people
Year of birth missing (living people)
Living people